Dolichotarsus is a genus of flies in the family Tachinidae.

Species
D. griseus Brooks, 1945
D. kingi Brooks, 1945
D. livescens Reinhard, 1958
D. stipatus Reinhard, 1958

References

Diptera of North America
Exoristinae
Tachinidae genera